When Daylight's Gone is the debut studio album by the symphonic black metal band Graveworm, released originally in 1997 through Serenades Records but was later re-released in 2001 through Last Episode with bonus tracks taken from the entirety of Underneath the Crescent Moon, the cover of which is the covers of the albums faded together in the middle.

Track listing
All lyrics by Stefan Fiori except tracks 5, 12 & 13. All music by Stefan Unterpertinger with as noted except tracks 12 & 13.
"Awake"                    – 6:29 
"Lost Yourself"            – 5:35 
"Far Away"                 – 7:25
"Eternal Winds"            – 5:14 
"Dark Silence" (Instrumental) – 1:32
"Tears from My Eyes"       – 4:14 
"When the Sky Turns Black" – 4:59 
"Another Season"           – 5:19
"Aeons of Desolation"      – 4:08 

Under the Crescent Moon bonus tracks

"Awaiting the Shining" – 3:52
"Awake... Thy Angels of Sorrow"  – 5:03
"By the Grace of God" – 4:55
"How Many Tears"         – 6:05 

Attention: "By the Grace of God" have no attitude to Kenny Håkansson, Nicke Andersson and band The Hellacopters.

Personnel
Stefano Fiori – vocals
Stefan Unterpertinger – lead guitar
Harry Klenk – rhythm guitar
Didi Schraffel – bass
Martin Innerbichler – drums
Sabine Mair – keyboards
Markus Costabiei – mastering

References

External links
When Daylight's Gone at Discogs

1997 albums
Graveworm albums